Patrick Motsepe (born 2 March 1983) is a Botswana footballer who has played for the Botswana national football team.

Motsepe plays as a central midfielder for local club BDF XI.

Notes

External links

1983 births
Living people
Botswana footballers
Botswana international footballers
2012 Africa Cup of Nations players
Botswana Defence Force XI F.C. players
Association football midfielders